Zhao Lusi (born 9 November 1998), also known as Rosy, is a Chinese actress and singer. She is best known for her roles in Oh! My Emperor (2018), Love Better than Immortality (2019), The Romance of Tiger and Rose (2020), Dating in the Kitchen (2020), The Long Ballad (2021), Please Feel at Ease Mr. Ling (2021), Who Rules The World (2022) and Love Like the Galaxy (2022).

Career

Beginnings
Zhao entered the entertainment industry by hosting the variety program Huo Xing Qing Bao Ju.

In 2017, Zhao made her acting debut with a supporting role in the web drama Cinderella Chef. The same year, she played a minor role in the film City of Rock.

Rising popularity
In 2018, Zhao gained attention for her supporting role in the historical romance series Untouchable Lovers. The same year, she played her first leading role in the time-travel historical drama Oh! My Emperor. The series gained a following online and led to increased recognition for Zhao. Zhao received the Newcomer award at the Golden Bud–The Third Network Film And Television Festival.

In 2019, Zhao played in the romance film Autumn Fairytale, based on the South Korean television series Autumn in My Heart. The same year, she starred in period fantasy Prodigy Healer, and historical romance Love Better Than Immortality. She later starred in the romance drama I Hear You with Riley Wang.

In 2020, Zhao starred in the xianxia series Love of Thousand Years. She then starred in historical romance drama The Romance of Tiger and Rose. The series was a hit, and was praised for its interesting setup and plot. She won the Best Leading Actress award at 2020 Wenrong Awards. The same year, she starred in the romance drama Dating in the Kitchen.

In 2021, Zhao starred as the second female lead in the historical series The Long Ballad,  which gained her the Asian Star Prize at 2021 Seoul International Drama Awards. Then she played the lead role in the romantic comedy Please Feel at Ease Mr. Ling, and starred in the period drama A Female Student Arrives at the Imperial College.

In 2022, she starred in the fantasy romance drama Who Rules The World with Yang Yang, based on the novel by Qing Lengyue, and starred in the historical romance drama Love Like the Galaxy alongside Wu Lei, based on the novel, "Xing Han Can Lan, Xing Shen Zhi Zai" by Guan Xin Ze Luan

Filmography

Film

Television Series

Variety Shows

Discography

Singles

Original soundtrack

Awards and nominations

References

External links

Zhao Luis’s instagram  

1998 births
Living people
Actresses from Sichuan
Chinese television actresses
Chinese film actresses
21st-century Chinese actresses
Actresses from Chengdu